Charles-Henri Petersen, born Carl Heinrich Petersen (1792-1859), was a German paysagist architect from Altenburg, Saxe. Around 1820, he moved to Belgium, where many of his works still exist. The importance of his interventions in parks and gardens, at the time of the nascent Belgium, made him a defender of "English-style" gardens and a pioneer in the design of monumental greenhouses with a European reputation, starting with the one built in the Parc de Bierbais (1828), where Peterson lived until his death on December 2, 1859.

Works 
 The park around the château de Bierbais, including the ancient monumental greenhouses, nowadays known as Les Orangeries de Bierbais, 1828 (pour C.J.G. de Man de Lennick)
 Botanical Garden of Brussels, opened in 1829 (reworked bur Jean-Baptiste Meeus-Wouters)
 Hof ter Mick at Brasschaat, 1830
 The park around the château de Leut, 1830 (in English style, only partially done)
 Park of the Domaine de Mariemont, 1832
 The park around the château de Merode in Westerlo, 1834 (plans executed in 1870)

See also 
 Mariemont, Belgium
 Orangeries de Bierbais

References 

 (nl) Xavier Duquenne, « Drie Duitse tuinarchitecten (Charles-Henri Petersen 1792-1859, Louis Fuchs 1818-1904, Édouard Keilig 1827-1895) », in Historische woonsteden & tuinen, 2008, 1, pp. 19–22.

1792 births
1859 deaths
German architects